Shorea micans is a species of plant in the family Dipterocarpaceae. The species name is derived from Latin (micans = gleaming) and refers to this species shiny leaves. It is a low emergent to main canopy tree, found in mixed dipterocarp forest on soils overlying ultrabasic rock.

Shorea micans is endemic to the island of Borneo, found only within the Malaysia Sabah section of the island. It has been found in numerous protected areas, including Bidu Bidu, Tawai, Meliau Range, Kuamas and Bukit Tingkar forest reserves.

References

micans
Endemic flora of Borneo
Trees of Borneo
Flora of Sabah
Taxonomy articles created by Polbot